Luis Caraballo (born December 30, 1991) is a Colombian footballer who currently plays for Liga Nacional de Honduras side Real Sociedad.

External links 

1991 births
Living people
Colombian footballers
Real Cartagena footballers
Liga Nacional de Fútbol Profesional de Honduras players
C.D. Real Sociedad players
Expatriate footballers in Portugal
Expatriate footballers in Honduras
Association football central defenders
Sportspeople from Cartagena, Colombia